Charles Keith Lehr, Jr., known as Keith Lehr (born November 1963) is an American poker player from his native Bossier City, Louisiana, who is a two-time World Series of Poker bracelet winner.

Poker career

Lehr won his first bracelet at the 2003 World Series of Poker in the $3,000 Pot Limit Hold'em event. His second bracelet came in the 2015 World Series of Poker Heads-up No Limit event earning $334,430.

Lehr (using the nickname "cheesemonster") won the Full Tilt Online Poker Series Main Event in May 2008, winning $410,780.

Lehr largest cashed was for $701,757 at the 2012 World Series of Poker $10,000 No-Limit Hold'em (Six Handed) event.

As of 2015, his earnings exceeded $2,100,000.

References

1963 births
Living people
American poker players
World Series of Poker bracelet winners
People from Bossier City, Louisiana
Louisiana Republicans